Croatian sign language (Hrvatski znakovni jezik, HZJ) is a sign language of the deaf community in Croatia. It has in the past been regarded as a dialect of Yugoslav Sign Language, although the dialectical diversity of the former Yugoslavia has not been assessed.

The first school for the deaf in Croatia was formed in Zagreb in 1885. The Sign Language and Deaf Culture conference was held in Zagreb, Croatia from May 3–5, 2001. In 2004, a project to establish a grammar of HZJ was started by researchers at Purdue University and the University of Zagreb.

By law Croatian Radiotelevision is to promote the translation of programs into HZJ. Major centres of education in HZJ are found in Zagreb, Split, Rijeka, and Osijek.

Organizations for the deaf in Croatia include the Croatian Association of Deafblind Persons DODIR, which was established in 1994.

The basic word order in HZJ is subject–verb–object (SVO), as it is in spoken Croatian. A two-handed manual alphabet is in widespread use; a one-handed alphabet based on the international manual alphabet, though less commonly used, has official status.

References

External links 
  Dictionary of Croatian Sign Language
  Croatian Deaf Portal.
  Croatian Association of Deafblind People Dodir.
  Croatian Association of the Deaf and Hard of Hearing.
 Possession and existence in three sign languages

French Sign Language family
Croatian culture
Languages of Croatia